The Islamic Foundation School or IFS is a Preschool to 12th grade mosque/private school in Villa Park, Illinois. It was established in 1986, by the Islamic Foundation, Villa Park. Students are taught about Islam in addition to their core academic subjects. It serves approximately 750 students.

IFS is one of the largest Islamic schools in the United States (by population.) Islamic Foundation also offers a Full/Half Time Hifz/Nazra Tajweed Qur'an reading class.  These classes are taught by qualified huffadh and are for both boys and girls.

History
While the eight founding families of Islamic Foundation initially congregated in 1973 and incorporated the institution in 1974, the inauguration of the Islamic Foundation activities began with the establishment of a weekend Islamic School in 1975.

By 1977, the Foundation was seemingly on track towards the establishment of their own center.  With the purchase of seven acres in Elmhurst, Illinois, announced in the February 1977 issue of The Voice of Islam, the Foundation's monthly newsletter to its parishioners, the community was well on its way to establishing an elaborate institution which went well beyond education:

The sale of the Villa Park school to Islamic Foundation was completed following the DuPage County Regional Board of School Trustees final approval rendered in October 1982. The Mosque and School still run to this day, with many students attending. The Mosque runs many events for the Muslim community in Villa Park, with many attendees arriving for the Friday prayer.

References

External links
 
 IFS website

Educational institutions established in 1986
Private high schools in Illinois
Islam in Illinois
Islamic schools in Illinois
Villa Park, Illinois
Schools in DuPage County, Illinois
Private middle schools in Illinois
Private elementary schools in Illinois
1986 establishments in Illinois